Edoardo Menichelli (born 14 October 1939) is a prelate of the Roman Catholic Church. He served as Archbishop of the Archdiocese of Ancona-Osimo from 2004 to 2017. Pope Francis made him a cardinal on 14 February 2015.

Biography

Early life
Edoardo Menichelli was born in Serripola in San Severino Marche in province of Macerata and the Diocese of San Severino Marche on 14 October 1939. He studied theology and philosophy at institutional seminars of San Severino Marche and Fano and then at the Pontifical Lateran University in Rome, where he obtained a licentiate in pastoral theology.

Priesthood and career
On 3 July 1965 he was ordered a priest of the Diocese of San Severino Marche. He then became assistant pastor in the parish of St. Joseph in San Severino Marche and taught religion in state schools. On 30 September 30, 1986, with the unification of the Diocese of San Severino Marche with the Archdiocese of Camerino, he was assigned to the new Archdiocese of Camerino-San Severino Marche.

From 1968 to 1991 he served in the Roman Curia in the Apostolic Signatura, then from 1992 to 1994 in the secretariat for the Congregation for the Oriental Churches, where he met the Cardinal Achille Silvestrini and became his secretary.

Episcopate 
On 10 June 10, 1994, he was appointed by Pope John Paul II as Archbishop of Chieti-Vasto. He was consecrated bishop on 9 July in Rome by Cardinal Silvestrini, with Archbishops Antony Valentini and Piergiorgio Nesti as co-consecrators. He spent ten years in Chieti. On 8 January 2004, Pope John Paul II appointed him Archbishop of Ancona-Osimo, and he took possession of the archdiocese on 7 March.  He has been secretary of the Committee for the family of the Italian Episcopal Conference and has headed committees for the family, ecumenism and the pastoral care of leisure for the Marche bishops' conference.

On 15 October 2014, on reaching his 75th birthday, he submitted his resignation as require by canon law but Pope Francis has extended the appointment for one year.

Cardinalate
On 4 January 2015 Pope Francis announced Menichelli would be made a cardinal at a consistory on 14 February. He was assigned the titular church of Sacri Cuori di Gesù e Maria a Tor Fiorenza.

He was appointed a member of the Congregation for the Oriental Churches and of the Pontifical Council for the Pastoral Care of Health Care Workers.

Pope Francis accepted his resignation as archbishop on 14 July 2017.

On 30 September 2017 Francis named him a member of the Supreme Tribunal of the Apostolic Signatura.

See also

Cardinals created by Pope Francis

References

External links
 

1939 births
Living people
21st-century Italian cardinals
Cardinals created by Pope Francis
21st-century Italian Roman Catholic bishops
Pontifical Lateran University alumni
Members of the Congregation for the Oriental Churches
People from the Province of Macerata